Pleroma elegans, synonym Tibouchina elegans, is an ornamental plant in the family Melastomataceae.

The plant is endemic to the Atlantic Forest ecoregion in southeastern Brazil.

In addition, this plant is cited in Flora Brasiliensis by Carl Friedrich Philipp von Martius.

References

External links
  Flora Brasiliensis: Tibouchina elegans

elegans
Endemic flora of Brazil